The Slovenia Open is a women's tennis tournament held in Portorož, Slovenia, originally from 2005 until 2010, and returning to the tour in 2021. The WTA Tour event was a WTA International category, and now its current variant, the WTA 250 category. It is played on outdoor hardcourts.

Katarina Srebotnik finished runner-up in the singles finals of 2005 and 2007, and in the doubles final in 2005.

Past finals

Singles

Doubles

External links 
 Official website

 
Tennis tournaments in Slovenia
Hard court tennis tournaments
WTA Tour
Recurring sporting events established in 2005
Recurring sporting events disestablished in 2010
2005 establishments in Slovenia
Portorož
Defunct tennis tournaments in Europe
2010 disestablishments in Slovenia
Defunct sports competitions in Slovenia